Edna Bejarano is an Israeli-born German singer. She was born in 1951 in Tel Aviv, the daughter of Esther Bejarano. The family moved to Germany in 1960. She was the lead singer of the German rock band The Rattles and sang on their biggest selling record, the 1970 song "The Witch", which sold over one million copies globally.

She also performed in the 1980s with her mother Esther Béjarano, one of the last survivors of the Women's Orchestra of Auschwitz, in the musical group Coincidence. They sang songs from the ghetto and in Hebrew as well as anti-fascist songs.

References

External Links
 
 

20th-century German women singers
Living people
1951 births
20th-century Israeli women singers
Israeli emigrants to Germany